Monkeybicycle is a literary journal with both print and Web versions. It was founded in 2002 in Seattle, Washington, by Steven Seighman. He was intent on publishing both well-known writers and those who might not have been heard of yet, but should be. He enlisted the help of writer Shya Scanlon and together ran both versions of the journal, as well as created a very successful monthly reading series in downtown Seattle.

In 2007, Monkeybicycle became an imprint of Dzanc Books.

Monkeybicycle.net
The Monkeybicycle Web site is updated twice each week. Since its inception in 2002, it has gained quite a following. With features like One-sentence stories, videos and audio podcasts, the site receives between 350–400 unique visitors per day. Past Web site editors have included Matthew Simmons, Andrew Ervin, and Eric Spitznagel.

In 2007, one of monkeybicycle.net's stories, "Beginnings of Ten Stories About Ponies," by Wendy Molyneux, was selected for inclusion in the Dave Eggers edited the Best American Nonrequired Reading 2007 anthology. Another story, "The Day the Aliens Brought the Pancakes" by Eric Spitznagel, was also selected as a "notable" story in the anthology.

In 2008, two of monkeybicycle.net's stories, "Feet in Socks" by Amy Guth and "Intellectual Property" by Angela Woodward were selected as notable stories for the 2008 Million Writers Award.

In 2009, Stefanie Freele's story, "Tinfoilers," was one of the Wigleaf Top 50 (Very) Short Fictions, selected by editor Darlin' Neal.

Writers who have appeared on the Monkeybicycle Web site
Charlie Jane Anders
Blake Butler
Stephen Elliott
Roxane Gay
J. Robert Lennon
Tao Lin
Patton Oswalt
Davy Rothbart

The Monkeybicycle print edition
Twice each year, Monkeybicycle publishes a print edition, which features fiction, poetry and nonfiction. It is available in several bookstores around the United States, as well as on the Monkeybicycle Web site. Each edition costs $12.00, and two- and four-issue subscriptions are also available at a discounted rate.

Writers who have appeared in the Monkeybicycle print edition
Steve Almond
Charlie Jane Anders
Chris Bachelder
Matt Bell
Ryan Boudinot
Arthur Bradford
Susannah Breslin
David Cross
Elizabeth Ellen
Stephen Elliott (author)
Pia Z. Ehrhardt
Andrew Ervin
Bob Fingerman
Roxane Gay
Peter Grosz
Amy Guth (author, writer, radio host)
Michael Hickins
Samantha Hunt
Dan Kennedy
Lawrence Krauser
Ben Loory
Wendy Molyneux
Patton Oswalt
Dawn Raffel
Sarah Silverman
Laura van den Berg
Many others

Monkeybicycle3
The third print issue of Monkeybicycle was published in 2004 as a joint effort with the literary journal, Hobart. One of this issue's stories, "Free Burgers for Life," written by Ryan Boudinot, was accepted for inclusion in The Best American Nonrequired Reading 2003.

Monkeybicycle5
This version of the Monkeybicycle print edition is all humor, is guest-edited by Eric Spitznagel, and contains an introduction from comedian David Cross. It also features contributions from Patton Oswalt and a comic drawn by Johnny Ryan and written by Sarah Silverman.

Monkeybicycle6
Issue six of Monkeybicycle received fantastic reviews in print and on the web. It's the highest-selling issue to date.

Monkeybicycle7
Issue seven of the magazine was published in August 2010. Contributors are: Elizabeth Alexander, Angi Becker Stevens, Ryan Boudinot, Rita Dahl, Craig Davis, Andrew Ervin, Molly Gaudry, Roxane Gay, Aaron Gilbreath, Reed Hearne, James Kaelan, Corey Mesler, Weam Namou, Daniel Romo, Ken Saji, Shya Scanlon, Tyler Stoddard Smith, Rebecca van Laer, Yassen Vassilev, Edwin Wilson Rivera, and Michael Wood.

Monkeybicycle staff
Founding Editor: Steven Seighman
Web Editor: James Tate Hill

Previous Editors: J. Bradley, Laura Carney, Andrew Ervin, Jessa Marsh, Eddie Rathke, Shya Scanlon, Katie Schwartz, Matthew Simmons, Jacob Smith, Eric Spitznagel, J.A. Tyler

See also
List of literary magazines

References

External links
www.monkeybicycle.net (official Web site)
Dzanc Books
an interview with J.A. Tyler
 Radio Interview with Eric Spitznagel  on "Read First, Ask Later" (Ep. 23)

2002 establishments in Washington (state)
Biannual magazines published in the United States
Literary magazines published in the United States
Magazines established in 2002
Magazines published in Seattle